Güçlü is a Turkish surname. Notable people with the surname include:

 Ayhan Güçlü, Turkish footballer
 Dilaver Güçlü, Turkish footballer
 Mehmet Güçlü, Turkish wrestler
 Roza Güclü Hedin (born 1982), Swedish politician
 Sami Güçlü, Turkish politician

See also
 Güçlü, Silvan

Turkish-language surnames